Yann Huguet (born 2 May 1984, in Lesparre) is a French former professional road bicycle racer, who competed as a professional between 2007 and 2013. He had two major victories in his career, the first at the 2009 Tour du Doubs, and the second at the Hel van Het Mergelland.

Major results

2005
 1st, Stage 2, Giro della Valle d'Aosta
2006
 1st, Stage 4, Giro delle Regione
 1st, Stage 5, Vuelta a Navarra
2007
 2nd, Tour du Finistère
 2nd, GP Plumelec-Morbihan
 3rd, Route Adélie
2010
 1st, Hel van het Mergelland

References

External links 
Profile at Cofidis official website 

French male cyclists
1984 births
Living people
Sportspeople from Gironde
Cyclists from Nouvelle-Aquitaine
21st-century French people
20th-century French people